Events from the year 1539 in Sweden

Incumbents
 Monarch – Gustav I

Events

 - The Legal, Financial and Administrative Services Agency is founded. 
 - The German Georg Norman is employed as teacher of the Crown Prince and organizer of the Swedish church. 
 - The Roman mass is banned.

Births

 6 June - Catherine Vasa, princess   (died 1610)
 - Karin Hansdotter, royal lover   (died 1596)

Deaths

References

 
Years of the 16th century in Sweden
Sweden